Yann Richard, born in 1948 in Joncy (Saône-et-Loire), France, professor emeritus of the Sorbonne nouvelle (Paris) is a specialist of modern Shiʿism, the history of contemporary Iran as well as Persian literature.

Publications 
1980: Le Shi'isme en Iran. Islam et révolution, Paris, Jean Maisonneuve, 1980, 135p.
1982: [Persian edition and transl. into French with introduction]: Nuroddin ‘Abdorrahmân b. Ahmad JÂMI, Les Jaillissements de Lumière. Lavâyeh, Paris, Les Deux Océans, 181 p.
1987: [Codirected with Bernard Hourcade]: Téhéran, Au-dessous du volcan, Paris, Autrement, 222 p.
1989: [under his direction]: Entre l'Iran et l'Occident: Adaptation et assimilation des idées et techniques occidentales en Iran, éditions de la Maison des Sciences de l'Homme, Paris, 242 p.
1990: [Codirected with Gilles Kepel]: Intellectuels et militants de l'Islam contemporain, édition du Seuil, 287 p.  
1995: Shi'ite Islam : Polity, Ideology, and Creed, Transl. by Antonia Nevill, Oxford - Cambridge, XIII-241 p. (from the French L'Islam chiite : Croyances et idéologies, éditions Fayard, 302 p.)
2003: 100 mots pour dire l'Iran moderne, éditions Maisonneuve & Larose, 220 p.
2006: L'Iran. Naissance d'une république islamique, éditions de La Martinière, 378 p.
2007: [Cowritten with Jean-Pierre Digard and Bernard Hourcade]: L'Iran au XXe siècle : Entre nationalisme, islam et mondialisation, éditions Fayard, 501 p. (3nd edition)
2009: L'Iran de 1800 à nos jours, Flammarion, 472 p. (reedition of "L'Iran. Naissance d'une république islamique")
2010: [Edition and introduction] C.J. Edmonds, East and West of Zagros. Travel, war and politics in Persia and Iraq, 1913-1921, Leiden - Boston, Brill, XXI-377 p.
2015: [Edition and introduction] Regards français sur le coup d’État de 1921 en Perse, Journaux personnels de Georges Ducrocq et Hélène Hoppenot, Leiden - Boston, Brill, VI-699 p.
2016: L'Iran de 1800 à nos jours, Flammarion, 492 p. (new edition with corrections and additional chapter)
2019 : Iran. A Social and Political History since the Qajars, Cambridge, Cambridge University Press

External links 
CNRS, Sorbonne nouvelle Yann Richard
Les Conférences de Faidherbe Lecture on the Islamic Revolution of 1979 
Le Journal de Saône et Loire Interview with Yann Richard

French sociologists
French Iranologists
1948 births
People from Saône-et-Loire
Living people